Melissa Ester Jiménez Guevara (born December 9, 1998, in Maracaibo, Zulia) is a Venezuelan model and beauty titleholder who was crowned Miss Venezuela International 2019. She represented the state of Zulia at the pageant and represented Venezuela at Miss International 2019 where she finished as Top 15.

Personal life
Jiménez was born and raised in Maracaibo, Zulia state, Venezuela. She is currently studying a bachelor's degree in Nutrition and Dietetics at University of Zulia in Maracaibo city. She was also a professional acro dancer for 13 years and is a certified life coach.

Melissa started modeling at the age of 15.

Pageantry

Miss Zulia 2018
The first participation of Jiménez on a beauty contest was in the regional competition, Miss Zulia 2018, where she was selected as one of the winners.

Miss Venezuela 2019
Jiménez stands at 174 centimeters and competed as Miss Zulia 2019. As one of 24 finalists in her country's national competition, she was awarded Best Hair at the grand final show of Miss Venezuela 2019. She succeeded outgoing Miss Venezuela International 2017 and Miss International 2018, Mariem Velazco of Barinas.

Miss International 2019
On November 12, 2019, she represented Venezuela at the Miss International 2019 pageant hosted in the Tokyo Dome City Hallin Tokyo, Japan. For her national costume, she chose to represent an allegory of Wayuu communities. On the final night she placed as one of the Top 15.

References

External links
 Miss Venezuela Official Website
 

1998 births
Living people
Venezuelan female models
Venezuelan beauty pageant winners
Miss International 2019 delegates
People from Zulia
21st-century Venezuelan women